Margot Kraneveldt (born 1967) is a Dutch politician who has served as an MP in the Dutch House of Representatives.

Biography
Kraneveldt studied languages at the Free University of Amsterdam. She worked as a high school German teacher and later for a publishing company. In 2002, she became a policy officer and assistant for Pim Fortuyn List MP Vic Bonke. In 2003, she entered the House of Representatives as an MP on behalf of the LPF. Kraneveldt was involved in the policy areas of education, culture, media, childcare, emancipation and family affairs, and technology and science policy. In 2004, she submitted a motion to instill more integration policies in high schools for students born outside the Netherlands. The motion was approved by the PvdA and VVD and was passed. In 2006, she resigned from the LPF due to the deteriorating conditions in the party and disagreements with its course, in particular due to its continuing support for the third Balkenende cabinet minority government which she disapproved of. Her seat in parliament was turned over to Gonny van Oudenallen.

References

1967 births
Living people
Pim Fortuyn List politicians
Labour Party (Netherlands) politicians
21st-century Dutch educators
21st-century Dutch politicians
21st-century Dutch women politicians
Members of the House of Representatives (Netherlands)
Vrije Universiteit Amsterdam alumni